Bytyń  is a village in the administrative district of Gmina Kaźmierz, within Szamotuły County, Greater Poland Voivodeship, in west-central Poland.

The village has a population of 540.

The landmarks of the village are the Gothic Immaculate Conception church and the Niegolewski Palace.

History

The oldest known mention of the village comes from 1322. Bytyń was a private village owned by Polish nobility, including the Konarzewski and Niegolewski families, and was administratively located in the Poznań County in the Poznań Voivodeship in the Greater Poland Province of the Kingdom of Poland.

In 1873 a unique copper treasure from around 2000 BC was discovered in the village, including carved figures of oxen known as the Oxen of Bytyń, which are now part of the collection of the Archaeological Museum in Poznań.

During the German occupation of Poland (World War II), in November 1939, the Germans carried out a massacre of 72 Poles from the county in the Bytyń Forest as part of the Intelligenzaktion.

Notable people
 Andrzej Niegolewski (1787-1857), Polish colonel, parliamentarian and activist

References

Villages in Szamotuły County
Nazi war crimes in Poland